Matt Taylor (born 16 September 1972 in Brisbane, Australia) is an Australian-born Scottish rugby union coach and is the assistant coach (defence) of the Australian National Rugby union team. He was formerly the assistant coach of the Scotland National Rugby Union  team, Glasgow Warriors and the Queensland Reds.

Rugby Union career

Playing career

He holds a British passport as his parents are from Dunfermline, Fife. He played in the Flanker position.

As a rugby player he played for various Scottish sides; Aberdeen GSFP, Edinburgh Rugby and Border Reivers.

He also played for Exeter Chiefs.

He was capped for Scotland 'A' thus confirming his Scottish nationality under World Rugby regulations.

Coaching career

He was previously a defence coach of Queensland Reds. As a defence coach he has led Queensland Reds to the Super Rugby title in 2011.

He joined Glasgow Warriors in August 2012. As a defence coach he has led Glasgow Warriors to the Pro12 title in 2015.

Matt Taylor's contracts as assistant coach of Scotland and assistant coach of Glasgow Warriors were due to expire at end of the 2015 World Cup. 

Taylor left Glasgow Warriors to follow Gregor Townsend in taking over the Scotland national rugby union team in May 2017. He remained there until 2019. 

In 2019 he was chosen by current Wallabies head coach Dave Rennie as defence coach. He is currently based in Australia.

External links
 Scottish Rugby profile
 Glasgow Warriors profile

References

1972 births
Living people
Glasgow Warriors coaches
Edinburgh Rugby players
Rugby union players from Brisbane
Scottish rugby union coaches
Scottish rugby union players
Border Reivers players
Aberdeen GSFP RFC players
Exeter Chiefs players
Scotland 'A' international rugby union players
Rugby union flankers